Bijacovce (Hungarian: Szepesmindszent; German Biazowitz/Betendorf) is a village and municipality in Levoča District in the Prešov Region of central-eastern Slovakia. The village is along the famous Gothic Route and the church dates from the 13th century. The church is gothic with a rotunda to match. There is also a manor house from the 18th century in Bijacovce. The manor house was built between 1780-1785 by the Csaky family. The last renovation of the manor house was in 1955. However, it currently is off limits to the public because it was turned into a school. However, next to the manor house, there is a park with deer roaming around it.

History
In historical records the village was first mentioned in 1258.

Geography
The municipality lies at an altitude of 557 metres and covers an area of  (2020-06-30/-07-01).

Population 
It has a population of 968 people (2020-12-31).

See also
 List of municipalities and towns in Slovakia

References

Genealogical resources

The records for genealogical research are available at the state archive "Statny Archiv in Levoca,  Slovakia"

 Roman Catholic church records (births/marriages/deaths): 1646-1895 (parish A)

External links
https://web.archive.org/web/20070513023228/http://www.statistics.sk/mosmis/eng/run.html
http://www.bijacovce.sk
http://www.pamiatky.net/?q=node/3&mon=704621
Surnames of living people in Bijacovce

Villages and municipalities in Levoča District
Spiš